Slave quarters were buildings or districts where enslaved people were housed. Slave quarters may refer to:

 Barracoon, temporary holding quarters for the transatlantic slave trade 
 , housing for enslaved people in colonial Brazil
 Slave pens and slave quarters in the United States